Strike Back may refer to:
Strike Back (album), a 1986 album by the German band Steeler
Strike Back, a 2007 novel by author Chris Ryan
Strike Back (TV series), a TV series based on the Ryan novel
Chris Ryan's Strike Back, the first series, aired in 2010
Strike Back: Project Dawn, the second series, aired in 2011
Strike Back: Vengeance, the third series, aired in 2012
Strike Back: Shadow Warfare, the fourth series, aired in 2013
Strike Back: Legacy, the fifth series, aired in 2015
Strike Back: Retribution, the sixth series, aired in 2017
Strike Back: Revolution, the seventh series, aired in 2019
Strike Back: Vendetta, the eighth and final series, aired in 2020